Vida Movahedi (Persian: ویدا موحدی; born 1985 in Tehran), more commonly known as Vida Movahed, is an Iranian human rights activist, protester, and women's rights activist who is considered the initiator of the Girls of Enghelab movement. On December 27, 2017, on the Enghelab Street in Tehran, she symbolically took her white headscarf off to protest against the mandatory hijab in Iran. Subsequently, her picture was published as "The Girl of Enghelab Street".

The first protest
On December 27, 2017, Vida Movahedi removed her headscarf and stood on a utility box to protest against the mandatory hijab while moving her headscarf, which was tied to a stick. She was immediately arrested. On January 27, she was released after spending a month in custody.

The second protest
On October 29, 2018, Movahedi held a number of balloons and went to the top of the turquoise dome of the Enghelab square to protest against the compulsory hijab. Subsequently, she was arrested again and sentenced to one year in prison for the crime of encouraging people to commit corruption and prostitution through the removal of the hijab.

References

1985 births
Iranian women activists
Iranian women's rights activists
Living people

See also 
 Nasrin Sotoudeh
 Narges Mohammadi
 Women's rights movement in Iran